Maryland Route 307 (MD 307) is a state highway in the U.S. state of Maryland. Known for most of its length as Williamsburg Road, the state highway runs  from MD 331 in Hurlock north to the end of state maintenance at Charles Street a short distance east of the intersection with MD 313/MD 318 in Federalsburg. MD 307 was one of the first highways completed by the Maryland State Roads Commission when the Hurlock–Federalsburg Road was constructed in 1910. The highway was relocated between Williamsburg and Federalsburg in the 1960s.

Route description

MD 307 begins at a five-way intersection in the town of Hurlock in Dorchester County. Oak Street is the west leg of the intersection, while Main Street, which is MD 331 to the south, forms the north and south legs of the intersection. MD 331 heads northwest on Academy Street. MD 307 heads east as two-lane undivided Broad Street through an industrial area after a grade crossing with a spur of the Seaford Line of the Maryland and Delaware Railroad, which the state highway begins to parallel closely to the northwest as it leaves Hurlock. MD 307 continues northeast as Williamsburg Road through farmland. The state highway passes through the hamlet of Williamsburg and traverses Skinners Run before leaving the vicinity of the railroad. MD 307 enters Caroline County shortly before meeting MD 313/MD 318 (Federalsburg Highway) at the four-leg Federalsburg Roundabout. MD 307 continues east into the town of Federalsburg and reaches its eastern terminus at Charles Street. Academy Avenue continues east as a municipal street toward Main Street in downtown Federalsburg.

History
The segment of MD 307 between the town limits of Federalsburg and the Dorchester County line was the first section of state road placed under contract for construction by the Maryland State Roads Commission in June 1909. That section of road and the remainder of the highway southwest to Hurlock were completed in 1910. The portion of original highway between Williamsburg and just west of Federalsburg was bypassed in 1970; the old alignment is now Whitely Road. The Federalsburg Roundabout was constructed in 1998.

Junction list

See also

References

External links

MDRoads: MD 307
MD 307 at AARoads.com
Maryland Roads - MD 307

307
Maryland Route 307
Maryland Route 307